Potentilla fragarioides is a member of the family Rosaceae that is native to China, Japan, Korea, Mongolia, and Russia.

Ethnomedical uses
The stem is boiled for use as a hemostatic in Traditional Chinese Medicine (TCM).

D-Catechin has been isolated as the agent of action, being used to stem vaginal bleeding.

References

fragarioides
Flora of Eastern Asia
Flora of China
Flora of Mongolia
Plants described in 1753
Taxa named by Carl Linnaeus